Rushana Nurjavova (born 22 June 1994) is a Turkmen judoka. She competed at the 2016 Summer Olympics in the women's 57 kg event, in which she was eliminated in the first round by Hedvig Karakas.

References

1994 births
Living people
Turkmenistan female judoka
Olympic judoka of Turkmenistan
Judoka at the 2016 Summer Olympics